Santa Anna may refer to:

 Santa Anna, Texas, a town in Coleman County in Central Texas, United States
 Santa Anna, Starr County, Texas
 Santa Anna Township, DeWitt County, Illinois, one of  townships in DeWitt County, Illinois, United States.
 Santa Anna (1522 ship), a 16th-century war ship of the Knights Hospitaller
 Santa Anna (1806 ship), a Spanish ship that a British privateer captured in 1806 that became a whaling ship
 Antonio López de Santa Anna (1794–1876), Mexican politician and general
 Santa Anna (Comanche war chief) (c. 1798–1849), Native American tribal leader

See also 
 Sant'Anna (disambiguation)
 Santa Ana (disambiguation)